Trem da Alegria (Train of Happiness) was a children's musical band based in Brazil. During their tenure from 1984 to 1992, they released eight albums whose total sales surpassed six million copies.

The band started in 1984 with Luciano Nassyn and Patricia Marx, recording the album Clube da Criança with Xuxa and Carequinha. The duo's boom came with the album Carossel da Esperança and the hit single "É de Chocolate".

Trem da Alegria's "members were 'recruited by advertising agencies'". In 1985, after Juninho Bill joined the band, they recorded their first album, Trem da Alegria do Clube da Criança, which featured guest performers Lucinha Lins ("Dona Felicidade") and The Fevers ("Uni, Duni, Te"). 
Trem was among Brazil's top-selling artists during 1987, along with Xuxa and Jairzinho e Simony.

Members

See also 
Turma do Balão Mágico

References 

Musical groups established in 1984
Musical groups disestablished in 1992
Brazilian pop music groups
Child musical groups
RCA Records artists